The 574th Volksgrenadier Division was a German military unit during World War II. It formed on 25 August 1944 from the remnants of the previously annihilated 277th Infantry Division. On 4 September 1944 the unit was renamed to 277th Volksgrenadier Division.

References

Military units and formations disestablished in 1945
Volksgrenadier divisions
Military units and formations established in 1944